The Southwest Ohio Regional Transit Authority (SORTA) is the public transport agency serving Cincinnati and its Ohio suburbs. SORTA operates Metro fixed-route buses, bus rapid transit, microtransit, and paratransit services. SORTA's headquarters are located at the Huntington Building in Cincinnati’s Central Business District. The agency is managed by CEO and General Manager Darryl Haley along with a 13-member board of trustees.

Downtown Cincinnati is also served by the Transit Authority of Northern Kentucky (TANK), whose transit services extend over the Ohio River into Northern Kentucky.

History 
SORTA replaced the Cincinnati Transit Commission, which operated buses from 1952 to 1973.  In 2012 SORTA Metro released its schedule information in the General Transit Feed Specification, making schedules more easily available to customers. The Cincinnati Bell Connector was operated by SORTA until 2019; the City of Cincinnati has since owned and operated the streetcar. Until 2021, SORTA Metro was funded primarily by Cincinnati's city earnings tax, second by fares, and third by federal sources, with some other minor sources. This stood in contrast to other Ohio transit agencies, such as COTA and GCRTA which are primarily funded by sales tax.  For a sense of perspective, the portion of Cincinnati's earnings tax going to Metro's budget was about 0.3%. On May 14, 2020, Hamilton County voters passed Issue 7, which switches the source of SORTA funding to a sales tax. The sales tax in Hamilton County will be raised to 7.8% and the Cincinnati earnings tax is eliminated. The levy is projected to generate $130 million a year, which will be split 100/30 between Metro and road infrastructure respectively. The new sales tax rate went into effect on October 1, 2020. The new funding will be used to implement Reinventing Metro, which is a transit network redesign of its fixed-route services, but also introduces Mobility on Demand and Bus Rapid Transit to the region.

Services 
Fixed-Route

SORTA Metro operates about 40 major fixed bus routes, as well as a demand-responsive paratransit service. Of the major routes, roughly half run only at rush hours and are essentially commuter services, some of them serving the reverse commute. The other half operate throughout the day, and some offer increased frequency during rush hours. Approximately 90% of all trips are made on the all-day routes, and 10% on the express commuter routes.

Routes 29X and 82X extend into neighboring Clermont County under an arrangement with the Clermont Transportation Connection. Routes 71X & 72X extend into neighboring Warren County under an arrangement with Warren County Transit. Route 42X extend into neighboring Butler County under an agreement with Butler County Regional Transit Authority (BCRTA).

Mobility on Demand (Spring 2023)

As part of the Reinventing Metro plan, SORTA Metro has the exciting opportunity to provide regional transit access to neighborhoods that historically have not had access to public transportation. Throughout 2021 and early 2022, Metro has been developing an accessible, on-demand and localized mobility service for all, including connections to Metro's network of more than 40 fixed bus routes.

Previously referred to as "Mobility On-Demand," this service will be called MetroNow!, with two zones planned to launch pilot service in early 2023. Following these initial pilot launches, Metro will roll out several additional service zones.

2

Reinventing Metro 
With the passage of Issue 7 in the spring of 2020, Hamilton County voters approved a sales tax levy of 0.8 percent and a new funding source for Metro. With improved funding, Metro is bringing to life its Reinventing Metro plan, offering the Greater Cincinnati region bold, new transit innovations that will help grow the regional economy and better connect our community to jobs, education, health care and entertainment. Metro will also be expanding local service into new areas as well as investing in waiting amenities such as new bus shelters, bus benches and transit centers. One example of the new Metro is the Northside Transit Center, which is located in Northside and replaced a basic bus stop.  The new transit center, which opened in 2020, features eight boarding bays, each with an architecturally designed shelter and enhanced streetscaping, lighting and amenities. In addition, the transit center features artwork designed by winners of the transit agency's art contest for Northside residents. The contest was launched to help add a special Northside touch to the center's design and asked residents to submit designs following the theme, "What does Northside mean to me?”
The artwork is displayed prominently on installations at the transit center's entrance and exit.  The Northside project was a partnership with the Federal Transit Administration, the City of Cincinnati, OKI Regional Council Governments, the Ohio Department of Transportation, and other local stakeholders.

Stops and stations 

Most of SORTA's roughly 3,600 stops are simply marked with a sign on a pole listing routes the stop serves, and are fairly infrastructure-light. Several dozen stops include bus shelters and covered benches. Several suburban stops are park-and-rides. Government Square is the main transit station, located downtown near Fountain Square.  SORTA owns and operates several transit centers across the region including the recently constructed Northside Transit Center, Oakley Transit Center, and Glenway Transit Center. SORTA operates the Riverfront Transit Center though it's only used for a layover point for the Metro*Plus route and a stop for route 85.

Fares 
On April 4, 2021, Metro introduced a simpler fare structure. With this new fare model, base fare increased 25 cents to $2 per ride on all local routes. Express buses are $2.65 within Hamilton County. Certain express routes turned into commuter routes and have a $2 fare. Express routes that go into Butler, Clermont, and Warren County have a fare of $3.75. Zone fares and paper transfers were eliminated. Transfers are only available to those using the Transit app and to 5-ride ticket users. There are several day pass options available to purchase. Mobile fares must be purchased through the Transit app. Refer to the charts for more information. Transfers to higher-cost service require payment of the fare difference. Children under 5 ride for free with a fare-paying rider; a limit of 2 children applies.

Paper transfers are no longer be issued as of 4/10/2021. Zone fare was eliminated on 4/4/2021.

Garages and fleet 
SORTA operates about 350 buses on fixed routes, and about 50 smaller vehicles as part of their demand responsive services. All vehicles in SORTA's fleet are ADA accessible. On average, vehicles in the fixed route fleet are 6.9 years old, and in the demand-responsive fleet 1.4 years.  Vehicles in the fixed route fleet are rated, on average, for a capacity and 65 passengers, both sitting and standing.

All fixed-route buses have a bike rack mounted on the front with room for two bicycles.

Garages
Queensgate Garage 1401 Bank Street, Cincinnati, OH 45214
Bond Hill Garage 4700 Paddock Road, Cincinnati, OH 45229

 Future bus orders

See also 
Adjacent public transit agencies:
 Butler County Regional Transit Authority (BCRTA), serving Butler County, Ohio
 Clermont Transportation Connection (CTC), serving Clermont County, Ohio
 Transit Authority of Northern Kentucky (TANK), serving Northern Kentucky
 Warren County Transit, serving Warren County, Ohio

Other major public transit agencies in Ohio:
 Central Ohio Transit Authority (COTA), serving Columbus, Ohio
 Greater Cleveland Regional Transit Authority (GCRTA), serving Cleveland, Ohio
 Greater Dayton Regional Transit Authority (formerly the Miami Valley RTA), serving Dayton, Ohio

References

External links 
 Go Metro, SORTA official website

1973 establishments in Ohio
Bus transportation in Cincinnati
Bus transportation in Ohio
Government agencies established in 1973
Intermodal transportation authorities in Ohio
Passenger rail transportation in Cincinnati
Passenger rail transportation in Ohio
Transit agencies in Ohio
Transportation in Cincinnati
Transportation in Hamilton County, Ohio